WCSB (89.3 FM) – branded WCSB 89.3 – is a non-commercial educational college/variety radio station licensed to Cleveland, Ohio.  Owned by Cleveland State University, the station serves Greater Cleveland and is student-run.  The WCSB studios are located at Cole Center on the campus of Cleveland State in Downtown Cleveland, while the station transmitter resides atop Rhodes Tower.

History
WCSB began broadcasting on May 10, 1976.

Station Events
WCSB holds an annual party and concert near Halloween. The Halloween Masquerade Ball began in 2009 as a 'thank you' to the station's listeners and their undying support. It is a free event that is offered to the local community. Until 2016, this event was held at the Cleveland Public Theater in the Gordon Square district of Cleveland. The Halloween Masquerade Ball precedes Radiothon, the annual week-long fundraising event in November.

WCSB also holds an annual record fair in the Summer. The Record Fair offers merchandise from dozens of music media and clothing vendors, attracting many music fans from across the region.

Current programming
WCSB airs a wide variety of music, including blues, noise and experimental, ambient, electronic jazz as well as traditional jazz, Eastern Bloc punk, outlaw country, reggae, soca, synthpop, darkwave, new wave, minimal wave, electronica, IDM, heavy metal and grindcore, hip hop, turntablism and soul.  The station also airs late night talk radio, as well as news, information and music oriented toward many of the ethnic groups represented in Greater Cleveland: Latin, Hispanic, German, Hungarian, Polish, Irish, Arabic, and Slovenian.  Weekly public affairs programs focus on a range of topics, from social justice to space exploration.

References

External links

1976 establishments in Ohio
Cleveland State University
CSB
Radio stations established in 1976
CSB